A Demon for Trouble is a 1934 American black-and-white action/adventure/romance short film directed by Robert F. Hill and produced by A. W. Hackel for Supreme Pictures. It stars Bob Steele, Don Alvarado, Gloria Shea, and Nick Stuart and was released in the United States on August 10, 1934.

Bob Steele had just left Monogram Pictures. The film was the first of an eight-picture contract he signed with Sam Katzman's Supreme Pictures.

Plot
Having been wrongly accused of the murder of Buck Morton (Nick Stuart), Bob Worth (Bob Steele) is now on the run from the sheriff (Lafe McKee). With the help of outlaw Gallinda (Don Alvarado), Bob must somehow prove that the real culprit is real estate mogul Dyer (Walter McGrail).

Production
Nick Stuart played a key support role.

See also
 Bob Steele filmography

References

External links
 
 

1934 films
American black-and-white films
1930s action adventure films
1930s romance films
American romance films
American action adventure films
Films directed by Robert F. Hill
1930s English-language films
1930s American films